Ahmad Mahrus Bachtiar (born September 3, 1987, in Jepara, Central Java) is an Indonesian professional footballer who plays as a defender for Liga 2 club Muba Babel United. He previously played for Sriwijaya in the Indonesia Super League.

Club career

Muba Babel United
He was signed for Muba Babel United to play in Liga 2 in the 2020 season. This season was suspended on 27 March 2020 due to the COVID-19 pandemic. The season was abandoned and was declared void on 20 January 2021.

Honours

Club
Sriwijaya
 Indonesia Super League: 2011–12

References

External links
 Ahmad Mahrus Bachtiar at Liga Indonesia
 Ahmad Mahrus Bachtiar at Soccerway

1987 births
Association football defenders
Living people
Indonesian footballers
Liga 1 (Indonesia) players
Persijap Jepara players
Persiba Balikpapan players
Sriwijaya F.C. players
Indonesian Premier League players
People from Jepara
Sportspeople from Central Java